Ioannis Hatzisarantos (born 21 January 1948) is a Greek fencer. He competed in the individual sabre event at the 1972 Summer Olympics.

References

1948 births
Living people
Greek male sabre fencers
Panathinaikos fencers
Olympic fencers of Greece
Fencers at the 1972 Summer Olympics